Lin'an Prefecture (1129–1277) was after 1138 the capital of the Southern Song dynasty (1127–1279). With over one million people by 1276, it was the most populous city in the world. Lin'an Prefecture was located in modern northern Zhejiang around Hangzhou. Its administrative area is different from that of the modern prefecture-level city of Hangzhou.

Lin'an Prefecture fell to the Mongols in 1276.

References

Further reading

1129 establishments in Asia
12th-century establishments in China
1277 disestablishments in Asia
13th-century disestablishments in China
Liangzhe West Circuit
History of Hangzhou
Former prefectures in Zhejiang